Craugastor rugulosus is a species of frog in the family Craugastoridae.
It is endemic to Mexico.
Its natural habitats are subtropical or tropical dry forests, subtropical or tropical moist montane forests, and rivers.
It is threatened by habitat loss.

References

rugulosus
Amphibians described in 1870
Taxonomy articles created by Polbot